Nathan Massey is a Scotland international rugby league footballer who plays as a . He most recently played at club level as professional for the Canberra Raiders in the NRL.

Background
Massey was born in Lidcombe, New South Wales, Australia. He has Scottish ancestors, and was made eligible to play for Scotland due to the grandparent rule.

Playing career

Canberra Raiders
Massey played for the Canterbury-Bankstown Bulldogs in the 2010 Toyota Cup.

Massey debuted at fullback for Canberra in round 9 of the 2011 National Rugby League season against Manly-Warringah following an injury to Josh Dugan, the regular fullback.

International
Massey has Scotland heritage so he was able to represent the Scottish national team. Scotland's coach Steve McCormack was aware of this and he therefore picked Massey to be a part of his squad in the 2014 European Cup competition. He made his international début, in the tournaments opening game, against Wales.

References

1991 births
Living people
Australian people of Scottish descent
Australian rugby league players
Canberra Raiders players
Junior Kangaroos players
Mount Pritchard Mounties players
Rugby league fullbacks
Rugby league players from Sydney
Scotland national rugby league team players